Mana Hira Davis is a New Zealand stuntman, known best for his stunt work in The Lord of the Rings film trilogy.

Filmography

Stunts
 The Lord of the Rings: The Fellowship of the Ring (2001): Stunt Performer
 The Lord of the Rings: The Two Towers (2002): Stunt Performer
 The Lord of the Rings: The Return of the King (2003): Stunt Performer
 Without a Paddle (2004): Stunts (stunt double Dax Shephard)
 River Queen (2005): Stunts
 King Kong (2005): Stunt Performer
 X-Men: The Last Stand (2006): Stunts
 The Waterhorse (2007): Stunts
 30 Days of Night (2007): Utility Stunts (stunt double Josh Hartnett)

Miscellaneous crew
 The Last Samurai (2003) - Assistant Location Manager

Actor
 The Lord of the Rings: The Fellowship of the Ring (2001) - Goblin / Orc / Uruk-hai (uncredited)
 Turangawaewae (2002, Short) - Vietnam Soldier
 The Lord of the Rings: The Two Towers (2002) - Gondorian Soldier / Harad Warrior / Orc / Rohan Soldier / Uruk-hai (uncredited)
 King Kong (2005) - Army Soldier / Sailor / Skull Island Native (uncredited)
 The Chronicles of Narnia: Prince Caspian (2008) - Telmarine Soldier in Boat #1
 Ghost in the Shell (2017) - Bearded Man

External links
 

New Zealand stunt performers
Year of birth missing (living people)
Living people